In astrology, sidereal and tropical are terms that refer to two different systems of ecliptic coordinates used to divide the ecliptic into twelve "signs". Each sign is divided into 30 degrees, making a total of 360 degrees. The terms sidereal and tropical may also refer to two different definitions of a year, applied in sidereal solar calendars or tropical solar calendars.

While sidereal systems of astrology calculate twelve zodiac signs based on the observable sky and thus account for the apparent backwards movement of fixed stars of about 1 degree every 72 years from the perspective of the Earth due to the Earth's axial precession, tropical systems consider 0 degrees of Aries as always coinciding with the March equinox (known as the spring equinox in the Northern Hemisphere) and define twelve zodiac signs from this starting point, basing their definitions upon the seasons and not upon the observable sky wherein the March equinox currently falls in Pisces due to the Earth's axial precession. These differences have caused sidereal and tropical zodiac systems, which were aligned around 2,000 years ago when the March equinox coincided with Aries in the observable sky, to drift apart over the centuries.

Sidereal astrology accounts for the Earth's axial precession and maintains the alignment between signs and constellations via corrective systems known as ayanamsas (Sanskrit: 'ayana' "movement" + 'aṃśa''' "component"), whereas tropical astrology, to reiterate, is based upon the seasonal cycle of the Northern hemisphere and does not take axial precession into consideration. Though tropical astrology typically considers the zodiac of the Northern Hemisphere to be applicable without change to the Southern hemisphere, a small number of tropical astrologers modify the zodiac to reflect seasons in the Southern hemisphere, taking Libra as the sign that coincides with the spring equinox instead of Aries.

Ayanamsa systems used in Hindu astrology (also known as Vedic astrology) include the Lahiri ayanamsa and the Raman ayanamsa, of which the Lahiri ayanamsa is the most widely used. The Fagan-Bradley ayanamsa is an example of an ayanamsa system used in Western sidereal astrology. As of 2020, sun signs calculated using the Sri Yukteswar ayanamsa were around 23 degrees behind tropical sun signs. Per these calculations, persons born between March 12 – April 12, for instance, would have the sun sign of Pisces. Per tropical calculations, in contrast, persons born between March 21 – April 19 would have the sun sign of Aries.

Astronomic zodiac

A small number of sidereal astrologers do not take the astrological signs as an equal division of the ecliptic but define their signs based on the actual width of the individual constellations. They also include constellations that are disregarded by the traditional zodiac but are still in contact with the ecliptic.

For the purpose of determining the constellations in contact with the ecliptic, the constellation boundaries as defined by the International Astronomical Union in 1930 are used. For example, the Sun enters the IAU boundary of Aries on April 19 at the lower right corner, a position that is still rather closer to the "body" of Pisces, as the first sign rather than of Aries. The IAU defined the constellation boundaries without consideration of astrological purposes.

The dates the Sun passes through the 12 astronomical constellations of the ecliptic are listed below, accurate to the year 2011. The dates will progress by an increment of one day every 70.5 years. The corresponding tropical and sidereal dates are given as well.

See also
 Great year
 Astrology and science
 Synoptical astrology

References

 "The Primer of Sidereal Astrology," Cyril Fagin and Brigadier R. C. Firebrace, American Federation of Astrologers, Inc., (1971) 
 "The Real, Real Constellations of the Zodiac." John Mosley, Planetarian, Vol. 28, # 4, December (1999).
 "The Real Constellations of the Zodiac." Dr. Lee T. Shapiro, Planetarian,'' Vol 6, #1, Spring (1977). 
 
 A History of Western Astrology, by S. Jim Tester, 1987, republished by Boydell Press (January 1999),

External links
Vedic astrology -- critically examined by Dieter Koch, with an extended discussion of sidereal and tropical astrology.

Astrology by type
Hindu astrology
History of astrology